Newtongrange is a railway station on the Borders Railway, which runs between  and . It is owned by Network Rail and managed by ScotRail.

History
The station was previously closed (along with the Waverley Route) in 1969. The station reopened, to the south of the original, on 6 September 2015. On 9 September 2015 the Queen and Prince Philip stopped off in Newtongrange station to unveil a plaque to officially open the station. The new construction work was undertaken by BAM Nuttall.

The station also directly serves the National Mining Museum Scotland.

Services

As of the December 2022 timetable change, the station is served by a half-hourly service between Edinburgh Waverley and Tweedbank during the daytime, with an hourly service in the evenings (Monday to Saturday) and on Sundays. All services are operated by ScotRail.

Rolling stock used: Class 158 Express Sprinter and Class 170 Turbostar

References

External links
 
 

Borders Railway
Railway stations in Midlothian
Former North British Railway stations
Railway stations in Great Britain opened in 1908
Railway stations in Great Britain closed in 1969
Beeching closures in Scotland
Railway stations in Great Britain opened in 2015
Railway stations served by ScotRail
Reopened railway stations in Great Britain
1908 establishments in Scotland
1969 disestablishments in Scotland
2015 establishments in Scotland